The 2001–02 New Jersey Nets season was the Nets' 35th season in the National Basketball Association, and 26th season in East Rutherford, New Jersey. This season is notable for the Nets acquiring All-Star point guard Jason Kidd from the Phoenix Suns during the off-season. The Nets selected Eddie Griffin out of Seton Hall University with the seventh pick in the 2001 NBA draft, but soon traded him to the Houston Rockets in exchange for top draft pick Richard Jefferson and rookie center Jason Collins, and signed free agent Todd MacCulloch. The Nets won nine of their first twelve games, held a 26–11 record as of January 16, and held a 32–15 record at the All-Star break. The team finished first place in the Eastern Conference with 52 wins and 30 losses, their best record since joining the NBA after the ABA–NBA merger in 1976. As of 2022, this was the only season where the Nets won 50 or more games.

Kidd was credited for most of the turn-around, as the Nets had finished 26–56 the previous year. Kidd averaged 14.7 points, 7.3 rebounds, 9.9 assists and 2.1 steals per game, as he finished second to the Spurs' Tim Duncan in MVP voting, and was named to the All-NBA First Team, NBA All-Defensive First Team, and selected for the 2002 NBA All-Star Game, with head coach Byron Scott coaching the Eastern Conference. In addition, second-year star Kenyon Martin averaged 14.9 points and 1.7 blocks per game, although his rebounding had decreased to just 5.3 per game, while Keith Van Horn provided the team with 14.8 points and 7.5 rebounds per game, and Kerry Kittles, who returned after missing the previous season due to knee injuries, contributed 13.4 points per game. Jefferson averaged 9.4 points per game off the bench, and was selected to the NBA All-Rookie Second Team, while MacCulloch provided with 9.7 points and 6.1 rebounds per game, and Lucious Harris contributed 9.1 points per game off the bench. Jefferson also finished in second place in Rookie of the Year voting.

Under the guidance of Kidd and Martin, the young Nets team prospered through the playoffs, and ended up advancing all the way to the Eastern Conference title and the franchise's first-ever appearance in the NBA Finals. In the Eastern Conference First Round, they defeated the Indiana Pacers in five games, then defeated the Charlotte Hornets four games to one in the Eastern Conference Semi-finals. Then after trailing 2–1 to the 3rd-seeded Boston Celtics in the Eastern Conference Finals, the Nets would win the series four games to two. However, New Jersey's season would end without an improbable NBA crown, as the Nets were swept in four games by the Los Angeles Lakers.

Following the season, Van Horn and MacCulloch were both traded to the Philadelphia 76ers, whom MacCulloch had previously played for.

Draft picks

Roster

Roster notes
 Center Jamie Feick missed the entire season due to a ruptured Achilles tendon.

Regular season

Standings

Record vs. opponents

Game log

|- style="background:#cfc;"
| 1
| October 30
| Indiana
| W 103–97
| Keith Van Horn (26)
| Jason Kidd (10)
| Jason Kidd (9)
| Continental Airlines Arena8,749
| 1–0
|- style="background:#cfc;"
| 2
| October 31
| @ Boston
| W 95–92
| Jason Kidd (21)
| Todd MacCulloch (12)
| Jason Kidd (10)
| FleetCenter14,158
| 2–0

|- style="background:#fcc;"
| 3
| November 2
| @ Detroit
| L 88–102
| Richard Jefferson (17)
| Kidd & Williams (6)
| Jason Kidd (5)
| Palace of Auburn Hills22,076
| 2–1
|- style="background:#cfc;"
| 4
| November 3
| Charlotte
| W 95–85
| Keith Van Horn (28)
| Keith Van Horn (9)
| Jason Kidd (8)
| Continental Airlines Arena6,532
| 3–1
|- style="background:#cfc;"
| 5
| November 8
| Seattle
| W 106–94
| Todd MacCulloch (29)
| Keith Van Horn (12)
| Jason Kidd (13)
| Continental Airlines Arena5,277
| 4–1
|- style="background:#cfc;"
| 6
| November 10
| Cleveland
| W 87–84
| Kenyon Martin (18)
| MacCulloch & Van Horn (10)
| Three players (4)
| Continental Airlines Arena5,631
| 5–1
|- style="background:#cfc;"
| 7
| November 13
| @ Indiana
| W 91–82
| Jason Kidd (20)
| Keith Van Horn (13)
| Jason Kidd (10)
| Conseco Fieldhouse15,188
| 6–1
|- style="background:#cfc;"
| 8
| November 16
| New York
| W 109–83
| Kenyon Martin (21)
| Kenyon Martin (8)
| Jason Kidd (15)
| Continental Airlines Arena15,638
| 7–1
|- style="background:#fcc;"
| 9
| November 17
| Philadelphia
| L 82–94
| Kenyon Martin (16)
| Kidd & MacCulloch (9)
| Jason Kidd (12)
| Continental Airlines Arena17,318
| 7–2
|- style="background:#fcc;"
| 10
| November 19
| @ Denver
| L 96–99 (OT)
| Kenyon Martin (28)
| Richard Jefferson (8)
| Jason Kidd (13)
| Continental Airlines Arena11,319
| 7–3
|- style="background:#cfc;"
| 11
| November 21
| @ Utah
| W 90–89 (OT)
| Jason Kidd (18)
| Todd MacCulloch (11)
| Jason Kidd (6)
| Delta Center17,413
| 8–3

|- align="center"
|colspan="9" bgcolor="#bbcaff"|All-Star Break

|- style="background:#fcc;"
| 80
| April 14
| @ Toronto
| L 82–101
| Collins & Scalabrine (16)
| Brian Scalabrine (9)
| Anthony Johnson (5)
| Air Canada Centre19,800
| 51–29
|- style="background:#fcc;"
| 81
| April 16
| Detroit
| L 98–103
| Kerry Kittles (30)
| Aaron Williams (8)
| Jason Kidd (7)
| Continental Airlines Arena15,084
| 51–30
|- style="background:#cfc;"
| 82
| April 17
| @ New York
| W 99–94
| Four players (13)
| Keith Van Horn (8)
| Jason Kidd (5)
| Madison Square Garden19,763
| 52–30

Playoffs

|- align="center" bgcolor="#ffcccc"
| 1
| April 20
| Indiana
| L 83–89
| Jason Kidd (26)
| Kenyon Martin (13)
| Jason Kidd (9)
| Continental Airlines Arena18,555
| 0–1
|- align="center" bgcolor="#ccffcc"
| 2
| April 22
| Indiana
| W 95–79
| Jason Kidd (20)
| Jason Kidd (10)
| Jason Kidd (9)
| Continental Airlines Arena20,049
| 1–1
|- align="center" bgcolor="#ccffcc"
| 3
| April 26
| @ Indiana
| W 85–84
| Jason Kidd (24)
| Keith Van Horn (12)
| Jason Kidd (6)
| Conseco Fieldhouse18,345
| 2–1
|- align="center" bgcolor="#ffcccc"
| 4
| April 30
| @ Indiana
| L 74–97
| Kenyon Martin (13)
| Kenyon Martin (6)
| Jason Kidd (6)
| Conseco Fieldhouse18,345
| 2–2
|- align="center" bgcolor="#ccffcc"
| 5
| May 2
| Indiana
| W 120–109 (2OT)
| Jason Kidd (31)
| Kidd, Martin (8)
| Jason Kidd (7)
| Continental Airlines Arena20,049
| 3–2
|-

|- align="center" bgcolor="#ccffcc"
| 1
| May 5
| Charlotte
| W 99–93
| Jason Kidd (21)
| Jason Kidd (7)
| Jason Kidd (7)
| Continental Airlines Arena19,071
| 1–0
|- align="center" bgcolor="#ccffcc"
| 2
| May 7
| Charlotte
| W 102–88
| Lucious Harris (24)
| Keith Van Horn (11)
| Jason Kidd (6)
| Continental Airlines Arena20,049
| 2–0
|- align="center" bgcolor="#ffcccc"
| 3
| May 9
| @ Charlotte
| L 97–115
| Richard Jefferson (16)
| Collins, Kidd (7)
| Jason Kidd (6)
| Charlotte Coliseum11,363
| 2–1
|- align="center" bgcolor="#ccffcc"
| 4
| May 12
| @ Charlotte
| W 89–79
| Jason Kidd (24)
| Kidd, Van Horn (11)
| Jason Kidd (8)
| Charlotte Coliseum13,864
| 3–1
|- align="center" bgcolor="#ccffcc"
| 5
| May 15
| Charlotte
| W 103–95
| Jason Kidd (23)
| Kenyon Martin (6)
| Jason Kidd (13)
| Continental Airlines Arena20,049
| 4–1
|-

|- align="center" bgcolor="#ccffcc"
| 1
| May 19
| Boston
| W 104–97
| Jason Kidd (18)
| Jason Kidd (13)
| Jason Kidd (11)
| Continental Airlines Arena20,049
| 1–0
|- align="center" bgcolor="#ffcccc"
| 2
| May 21
| Boston
| L 86–93
| Jason Kidd (23)
| Jason Kidd (16)
| Jason Kidd (10)
| Continental Airlines Arena19,850
| 1–1
|- align="center" bgcolor="#ffcccc"
| 3
| May 25
| @ Boston
| L 90–94
| Kerry Kittles (19)
| Todd MacCulloch (11)
| Jason Kidd (11)
| FleetCenter18,624
| 1–2
|- align="center" bgcolor="#ccffcc"
| 4
| May 27
| @ Boston
| W 94–92
| Kerry Kittles (22)
| Keith Van Horn (10)
| Jason Kidd (9)
| FleetCenter18,624
| 2–2
|- align="center" bgcolor="#ccffcc"
| 5
| May 29
| Boston
| W 103–92
| Kerry Kittles (21)
| Jason Kidd (12)
| Jason Kidd (7)
| Continental Airlines Arena19,850
| 3–2
|- align="center" bgcolor="#ccffcc"
| 6
| May 31
| @ Boston
| W 96–88
| Kenyon Martin (16)
| Jason Kidd (13)
| Jason Kidd (13)
| FleetCenter18,624
| 4–2
|-

|- align="center" bgcolor="#ffcccc"
| 1
| June 5
| @ L.A. Lakers
| L 94–99
| Jason Kidd (23)
| Jason Kidd (10)
| Jason Kidd (10)
| Staples Center18,997
| 0–1
|- align="center" bgcolor="#ffcccc"
| 2
| June 7
| @ L.A. Lakers
| L 83–106
| Kerry Kittles (23)
| Jason Kidd (9)
| Jason Kidd (7)
| Staples Center18,997
| 0–2
|- align="center" bgcolor="#ffcccc"
| 3
| June 9
| L.A. Lakers
| L 103–106
| Jason Kidd (30)
| Kidd, Van Horn (5)
| Jason Kidd (10)
| Continental Airlines Arena19,215
| 0–3
|- align="center" bgcolor="#ffcccc"
| 4
| June 12
| L.A. Lakers
| L 107–113
| Kenyon Martin (35)
| Kenyon Martin (11)
| Jason Kidd (12)
| Continental Airlines Arena19,296
| 0–4

NBA Finals

Summary
The following scoring summary is written in a line score format, except that the quarter numbers are replaced by game numbers.

Aspects
Amid tensions between co-captains Shaquille O'Neal and Kobe Bryant, the franchise had another stellar season, finishing 58–24 (.707), good for second in the Pacific Division and earning the third seed in the Western Conference. Bryant and O'Neal were voted starters in the 2002 NBA All-Star Game, where Bryant won the game MVP trophy in his hometown Philadelphia. The duo appeared on the All-NBA First Team and Bryant was honored with an NBA All-Defensive Second Team selection.

Entering the 2001–02 season, the New Jersey Nets were enduring a three-year playoff drought and had a 73–141 record over that span. In 1999, the Nets hired Rod Thorn as team president and immediately, he hired the recently retired Byron Scott to coach New Jersey. Thorn then dealt for Stephon Marbury in a three-team trade with the Milwaukee Bucks and Minnesota Timberwolves, trading Sam Cassell away to the Bucks. Due to the Nets' 31–51 season in 1999–00 season, they had the first overall pick in the 2000 NBA draft, which they used to select power forward Kenyon Martin out of the University of Cincinnati. Despite the reshuffling of the roster and a Rookie of the Year season for Martin, New Jersey struggled, ending the season with a 26–56 (.317) record, and were bestowed the 7th pick in the upcoming Draft.

With another lottery pick, Thorn dealt it to the Houston Rockets for draftees Richard Jefferson, Jason Collins and Brandon Armstrong. The next day, Phoenix Suns owner Jerry Colangelo announced a franchise-shaking trade; Phoenix would swap their point guard Jason Kidd for his New Jersey counterpart Stephon Marbury.

With the Princeton offense installed from the coaching staff, the Nets rebounded to a 52–30 (.634) mark, a twenty-six-win improvement from the last season, and clinched the number-one seed in the Eastern Conference. Kidd finished the season awarded with first team spots on both the All-NBA and All-Defensive Teams and was selected for his fifth All-Star game. He also finished runner-up to San Antonio Spurs power forward Tim Duncan in the Most Valuable Player voting. Richard Jefferson was an NBA All-Rookie Second Team selection and Thorn, the architect of the franchise's resurgence, was awarded NBA Executive of the Year.

Game One
Los Angeles's Staples Center sold out for the inaugural game of the 2002 NBA Finals, with nearly 19,000 on hand. The Nets trotted out a lineup of Kidd, Kittles, Martin, Van Horn and MacCulloth to hold up against the two-time defending and heavily favored champions. The Lakers brought out Derek Fisher, Rick Fox, Shaquille O'Neal, Robert Horry, and Kobe Bryant, who drew the assignment of guarding Kidd. New Jersey head coach Byron Scott, a member of the Showtime Lakers, received a standing ovation.

Taking advantage of a late arrival to the arena by New Jersey, L.A. dominated the first 17 minutes of play with a 42–19 score by the 6:41 mark in the second quarter. From that point on, the Nets went on a 17–6 to close the lead to a respectable 12. They had no answer for O'Neal, however, who had bullied MacCulloth into 16 points and 6 rebounds by half-time. The Nets outscored the Lakers in the third but stood steadfast as Bryant scored 11 of his 22 in the third.

New Jersey battled back, coming as close as three several times in the final quarter. Desperate to take the lead, they utilized the "Hack-a-Shaq" strategy midway in the fourth. It backfired, as O'Neal was 5–8 from the free throw line and had 16 points and 9 rebounds in the period alone.

New Jersey was doomed by their late start and poor shooting. The Nets, who shot 45% from the field and 74% on free throws were 39% and 57% respectively. Kidd finished with a triple–double, the 26th in Finals history and the first since Charles Barkley's in the 1993 series.

Recap

Game Two
The second game was more of a statement as the Lakers clobbered the Nets by a score of 106-83 thanks to Shaquille O'Neal's 40 points, 12 rebounds, and 8 assists.

Recap

Game Three
Game Three would prove to a hard-fought game (much like the first game of the series) as the Lakers and Nets would trade leads throughout the game but thanks to Kobe Bryant's 36 points, 6 rebounds, 4 assists and 2 blocks the Lakers prevail by a score of 106-103 to take a commanding 3-0 series lead.

Recap

Game Four
Despite this being a hard-fought battle (much like the previous game and as well as the first game of the series) the Lakers still won game four and the championship, giving Phil Jackson his Red Auerbach-tying ninth title and the Lakers their third consecutive title (and fourteenth overall) making them the fifth team to win three consecutive titles and denying the Nets their first ever championship since the franchise moved to East Rutherford.

Recap

Player stats

Regular season

|-
| style="text-align:left;" | 
| 35
| 0
| 5.6
| .318
| .294
| .500
| 0.5
| 0.2
| 0.2
| 0.0
| 1.8
|-
| style="text-align:left;" | 
| 77
| 9
| 18.3
| .421
| .500
| .701
| 3.9
| 1.1
| 0.4
| 0.6
| 4.5
|-
| style="text-align:left;" | 
| 25
| 0
| 10.0
| .319
| .000
| .722
| 1.8
| 1.2
| 0.3
| 0.2
| 2.9
|-
| style="text-align:left;" | 
| 9
| 0
| 5.6
| .200
| .000
| .500
| 0.6
| 0.6
| 0.1
| 0.2
| 0.6
|-
| style="text-align:left;" | 
| 74
| 0
| 21.0
| .464
| .373
| .842
| 2.8
| 1.6
| 0.7
| 0.1
| 9.1
|-
| style="text-align:left;" | 
| 79
| 9
| 24.3
| .457
| .232
| .713
| 3.7
| 1.8
| 0.8
| 0.6
| 9.4
|-
| style="text-align:left;" | 
| 34
| 0
| 10.8
| .411
| .333
| .640
| 0.9
| 1.4
| 0.9
| 0.0
| 2.8
|-
| style="text-align:left;" | 
| 82
| 82
| 37.3
| .391
| .321
| .814
| 7.3
| 9.9
| 2.1
| 0.2
| 14.7
|-
| style="text-align:left;" | 
| 82
| 82
| 31.7
| .466
| .405
| .744
| 3.4
| 2.6
| 1.6
| 0.4
| 13.4
|-
| style="text-align:left;" | 
| 62
| 61
| 24.2
| .531
| .000
| .671
| 6.1
| 1.3
| 0.4
| 1.4
| 9.7
|-
| style="text-align:left;" | 
| 20
| 0
| 5.9
| .276
| .500
| .667
| 1.1
| 0.3
| 0.2
| 0.0
| 1.5
|-
| style="text-align:left;" | 
| 73
| 73
| 34.3
| .463
| .224
| .678
| 5.3
| 2.6
| 1.2
| 1.7
| 14.9
|-
| style="text-align:left;" | 
| 28
| 0
| 10.4
| .343
| .300
| .733
| 1.8
| 0.8
| 0.3
| 0.1
| 2.1
|-
| style="text-align:left;" | 
| 4
| 0
| 2.5
| 1.000
| .000
| 1.000
| 0.5
| 0.0
| 0.0
| 0.0
| 1.3
|-
| style="text-align:left;" | 
| 81
| 81
| 30.4
| .433
| .345
| .800
| 7.5
| 2.0
| 0.8
| 0.5
| 14.8
|-
| style="text-align:left;" | 
| 82
| 13
| 18.9
| .526
| .000
| .699
| 4.1
| 0.9
| 0.4
| 0.9
| 7.2
|}

Postseason

|-
|}

Awards and records
 Rod Thorn, NBA Executive of the Year
 Jason Kidd, All-NBA First Team
 Jason Kidd, NBA All-Defensive First Team
 Richard Jefferson, NBA All-Rookie Team Second Team

Transactions

References

 New Jersey Nets on Database Basketball
 New Jersey Nets on Basketball Reference

New Jersey Nets season
New Jersey Nets seasons
New Jersey Nets
New Jersey Nets
21st century in East Rutherford, New Jersey
Eastern Conference (NBA) championship seasons
Meadowlands Sports Complex